Yannis Clarence N'Gakoutou Yapéndé (born 30 September 1998) is a professional footballer who plays as a winger for Championnat National 2 club Lyon La Duchère. Born in France, he plays for the Gabon national team.

Club career
N'Gakoutou is a youth product of Drancy and Monaco before beginning his senior career with the reserves of Monaco in 2016. He moved to GOAL FC in 2020, but was hampered by injuries. He then transferred to Lyon La Duchère on 25 June 2021.

International career
N'Gakoutou was born in France to a Central African Republic father and Gabonese mother. He made his international debut with the Gabon national team in a 1–1 friendly tie with Mauritania on 4 January 2022. He was part of the Gabon squad for the 2021 Africa Cup of Nations.

Personal life
N'Gakoutou is the brother of the Central African Republic international footballer Quentin N'Gakoutou.

References

External links
 
 

1998 births
Living people
Sportspeople from Saint-Denis, Seine-Saint-Denis
People with acquired Gabonese citizenship
Gabonese footballers
Gabon international footballers
French footballers
French sportspeople of Gabonese descent
French sportspeople of Central African Republic descent
Gabonese people of Central African Republic descent
Sportspeople of Central African Republic descent
Championnat National 2 players
Championnat National 3 players
Association football fullbacks
2021 Africa Cup of Nations players
JA Drancy players
AS Monaco FC players
GOAL FC players
Lyon La Duchère players
Footballers from Seine-Saint-Denis
Black French sportspeople